Justine Henin defeated Samantha Stosur in the final, 6–4, 2–6, 6–1 to win the women's singles tennis title at the 2010 Stuttgart Open. This was Henin's first title since 2008, the year she first retired from professional tennis. Svetlana Kuznetsova was the defending champion, but she lost to Li Na in the second round.

Seeds
The top two seeds received a bye into the second round.

Draw

Finals

Top half

Bottom half

External links
Main Draw
Qualifying Draw

Porsche Tennis Grand Prix - Singles
Porsche Tennis Grand Prix